The Lithuanian Women's Supercup (Lietuvos moterų supertaurė) was a one-off fixture in Lithuanian football played between the A Lyga champions and the winners of the Lithuanian Women's Cup. In 2005 and 2006 Gintra Universitetas won the league and the cup thus the supercup was played against cup runners-up.

Previous winners
Previous winners are:

References

Cup
Women
National women's association football supercups